Fayetteville High School may refer to:

Fayetteville High School (Alabama), Sylacauga, Alabama
Fayetteville High School (Arkansas), Fayetteville, Arkansas
Fayetteville High School (Tennessee), Fayetteville, Tennessee
Fayetteville High School (Texas), Fayetteville, Texas
Fayetteville High School (West Virginia), Fayetteville, West Virginia
Fayetteville Academy, Fayetteville, North Carolina
Fayetteville Christian School, Fayetteville, North Carolina
Fayetteville Street Christian School, Asheboro, North Carolina
Fayetteville-Manlius High School, Manlius, New York
Fayetteville-Perry High School, Fayetteville, Ohio